Obtainium is an album by Skeleton Key, released in 2002 by Ipecac Recordings. The image on the CD is a representation of the bones of the inner ear, including the cochlea. The name is a play on the fictional element unobtainium.

Track listing
All tracks written by Skeleton Key.

 "Sawdust" – 3:39
 "One Way, My Way" – 3:31
 "Candy" – 3:17
 "Panic Bullets" – 3:28
 "The Barker of the Dupes" – 3:14
 "Kerosene" – 3:00
 "Dingbat Revolution" – 2:23
 "Roost in Peace" – 3:28
 "King Know it All" – 3:03
 "That Tongue" – 3:51
 "Say Goodnight" – 7:50

References

Skeleton Key (band) albums
2002 albums
Ipecac Recordings albums